William Brazier (born October 17, 1983) is an American rugby league footballer who plays for the United States national rugby league team, USA Falcons, Old Blue Rugby Football Club in the Rugby Super League (US) and the Connecticut Wildcats in the American National Rugby League. His position of choice is at prop or hooker.

Brazier was selected to participate in the 2008 USA Rugby National Guard Senior Men's National All-Star Championship and was selected to the initial squad slated to play for USA Rugby at the 2007 Rugby World Cup.

Background
Will Brazier was born in Bridgeport, Connecticut, USA.

Internationals
Brazier played for the USA Tomahawks representing the United States against Australia in rugby league football at the 2004 Liberty Bell Cup.  In that game, the USA led 24-6 before losing 36-24 to the world’s best rugby league team.

Brazier currently plays for the USA Falcons in rugby union.

College Rugby
Brazier was a four-year member of the Fairfield University Men's Rugby Football Club.  He was selected a USA Rugby Collegiate All-American in 2005 and a four-time New England Collegiate All- Star in 2002, 2003, 2004 and 2005.  Brazier received his bachelor's degree from Fairfield University in 2005.

Youth Rugby
Brazier began playing rugby during his senior year in high school for Fairfield Prep RFC. Soon thereafter, he was selected for the USA U19 team, where he gained four caps.

References

External links 
USA Falcons Profile: William Brazier
Old Blue RFC Profile: Will Brazier

1983 births
Sportspeople from Bridgeport, Connecticut
American rugby league players
United States national rugby league team players
Fairfield University alumni
Connecticut Wildcats rugby league players
Living people
Fairfield College Preparatory School alumni